Chak (Sindhi: چڪ) is a town situated on the west bank of the Indus River in Shikarpur District, Sindh, Pakistan. It is an economic, educational, social and transport hub of the adjoining towns and villages of the region. It is home to a population of more than 40,000 people and is a fast-growing town with good literacy rate and improving infrastructure. It is home to Mahar, Soomra, Channa and many other tribes. Chak also has an important place in Shikarpur District politically, socially and economically. Historically, Chak had been part of Sukkur District, but in the late 1970s it was made part of Shikarpur District. Chak shares strong economic and social ties with Sukkur because of the natural geographic and trade route proximity.

Etymology 
Chak is said to be derived from a Sindhi language word chakki, meaning 'pot wheel', which is used to make pottery from clay. The clay used to be obtained from the cheeki matti, the mud from inside the nearby 'Kacha' area, which is the area between two levees of the Indus River bordering the town. It is said that there used to live many potters in the area and the town got its name from the chakki (pot wheel) used by these people.

Climate 
The climate of Chak is hot and misty during summer days while cold and dry in winter. Generally the summer season commences in March–April and ends before October. January in winter chills from 7 to 22 °C. The summer temperature averages 35 °C though it often shoots up to 45 °C.

Economy 
Agriculture, retailer shops, jobs in government and private organisations are the main way of living. Wholesale market is also growing up. The Bhitai Bazar & Bazar-e-Raza running through the heart of the town are the main artery of business of this small but bustling town of the locality, attracting many visitors and customers from nearby towns and villages as well. Many short bazars have also sprung up in the outskirts of the town.

Transport 
Chak serves as a transport hub for the other towns of the locality. It is connected to Sukkur, Shikarpur and other towns via link roads leading to the National Highway (known as N-65). It is also connected to the Indus Highway (known as N-55) via Rustam town. A large number of businessmen, workers, employees, students and other people commute to Sukkur daily through designated travel services of dozens of buses and more than 60 vans to Sukkur and adjoining areas. Sukkur Airport is at a distance of around 20 kilometres south-east.

Education 
Despite meager resources and poor infrastructure, many students from this small town have made it to the top colleges and universities in the country. Also many people are working in good positions in government and private organisations. There are primary and high schools for girls and boys separately. Few years back the high school for boys was upgraded to higher-secondary school. However, the quality of teaching and infrastructure to cater to the higher-secondary level have yet to be improved. Therefore, a sizeable proportion of students still commutes to Sukkur for higher-secondary education.

Following are the main educational schools and centres in Chak:
Government Higher Secondary School
Government Girls High School
Government Primary School for Boys
Government Primary School for Girls
Ideal Public School
Shah Latif Public School
Al-Mustafa Public School

Libraries 
The Shah Latif Library, established in 1979 by local people on self-help basis, was the town's only library until recently. The library is named after the great Sufi scholar and saint Shah Abdul Latif Bhittai (1689–1752), who is considered as the greatest poet of the Sindhi language. The library has a repository of thousands of books mainly donated by local people. Unfortunately, now it is in a deplorable condition as it is housed in a rented old tattered building. The town very badly needs a new library with state-of-the-art facilities.

Shaheed Benazir Bhutto Library, established in 2004, is a welcome addition as it was the long-standing demand of the town. The library still does not have the basic information technology and e-learning infrastructure and needs to be upgraded so that the growing student population of the town can be connected to other national and international libraries electronically and be part of the increasingly knowledge-based and connected society.

Sathi library, also established on self-help basis in 2004, is based at the Humbah locality of the town. Despite its limited capacity, it is providing much needed services to a large number of students.

Sufi soul of the town 
Chak had been largely immune from the religious extremism and intolerance, as has been the case with Sindh in general. There have been many Sufi saints in the area, whose shrines are located mainly in Hazrat Humbah, Chak. People from all religious affiliations pay homage to these saints year-round, especially during the annual Urs. Apart from The Shah Latif Library and Bhitai Bazar, there are many shops, retailers and a school named after Shah Abdul Latif Bhittai in town, which shows the attachment of the local folk with the great Sufi saint and Sufism.

Shah Abdul Latif Bhittai's message of peace and prosperity not only at home but all the world, which is even more relevant today than ever before, is beautifully portrayed by his most famous verses translated below:

Oh God! May ever You on Sindh
bestow abundance rare;
Beloved! All the world let share
Thy grace, and fruitful be.

Places of interest 
Shrines of Sufi saints in Hazrat Humbah – especially during the annual Urs, the death anniversary of a Sufi saint held at the saint's shrine. The Urs is a grand affair in town, where people from all walks of life from Chak and surrounding villages make a determined effort to attend. The Urs lasts for three days. The musical gatherings are the central event of the Urs, where disciples and singers gather around and sing passages from verses of the saints. The anniversary is also marked by food fairs, open-air markets selling traditional Sindhi ware, and entertaining and competitive sports.

See also 

 Sukkur
 Sindhi
 Shah Abdul Latif Bhittai
 The Shah Latif Library

Populated places in Shikarpur District